The 2010 British motorcycle Grand Prix was the fifth round of the 2010 Grand Prix motorcycle racing season. It took place on the weekend of 18–20 June 2010 at Silverstone. It was the first event Valentino Rossi missed since his debut in 1996, due to a shin bone fracture at Mugello in practice for the previous Grand Prix.

Jorge Lorenzo dominated the MotoGP race, finishing nearly seven seconds clear of a battle for second place. Andrea Dovizioso won the battle for second, with Ben Spies passing countryman Nicky Hayden for third on the last lap to get his first ever MotoGP podium, and Casey Stoner recovered from a terrible start which left him last at the first corner to finish fifth ahead of front row starter Randy de Puniet.

MotoGP classification

Moto2 classification

125 cc classification

Notes

Championship standings after the race (MotoGP)
Below are the standings for the top five riders and constructors after round five has concluded.

Riders' Championship standings

Constructors' Championship standings

 Note: Only the top five positions are included for both sets of standings.

References

British motorcycle Grand Prix
British
Motorcycle Grand Prix